Aideen Nicholson (April 29, 1927 – May 31, 2019) was an Irish-born social worker and Canadian politician.

Background

Aideen Nicholson was born in Dublin, Ireland. She was educated at Trinity College Dublin, and later at the London School of Economics.

A social worker by profession, Nicholson worked at the Hospital for Sick Children in Toronto, taught at George Brown College and the University of Toronto and also worked at Ontario Correctional Services and as a founding member of the Ontario Commission on the Status of Women.

Politics

She entered politics in the 1974 federal election, defeating Paul Hellyer in the riding of Trinity in Toronto and was re-elected three times as a Liberal. She served as parliamentary secretary for several years:

 Parliamentary Secretary to the Minister of Consumer and Corporate Affairs (March 4-September 30, 1980)
 Parliamentary Secretary to the Postmaster General (March 4-September 30, 1980)
 Parliamentary Secretary to the Minister of Consumer and Corporate Affairs (October 1, 1978 – March 26, 1979)
 Parliamentary Secretary to the Minister of Supply and Services (October 1, 1977 – September 30, 1978)

Nicholson was on the Liberal front bench after the party entered the opposition as a result of the 1984 federal election. She served as Chair of the Public Accounts Committee from 1984 through 1987.

Due to redistribution, her riding disappeared prior to the 1988 election, and she decided to seek the Liberal nomination in St. Paul's riding,  which was held by Progressive Conservative cabinet minister Barbara McDougall. The nomination was contested by Paul Hellyer, whom Nicholson had defeated when he ran as a Tory in 1974 but who had rejoined the Liberals in 1982. Nicholson defeated Hellyer for the Liberal nomination, but was unable to defeat McDougall in the general election.

Later life

She subsequently was appointed to the Immigration Review Board.

In 2003, Nicholson was the recipient of the Distinguished Service Award by the Canadian Association of Former Parliamentarians.

Nicholson was residing in Elliot Lake, Ontario. She died on May 31, 2019.

References

External links
 

1927 births
2019 deaths
Alumni of the London School of Economics
Alumni of Trinity College Dublin
Canadian people of Irish descent
Women members of the House of Commons of Canada
Irish emigrants to Canada
Liberal Party of Canada MPs
Members of the House of Commons of Canada from Ontario
Women in Ontario politics